Kaxholmen is a locality situated in Jönköping Municipality, Jönköping County, Sweden with 1,458 inhabitants in 2010. The small locality is located near the lake of Landsjön which is well known for its bird-habitats.

References

External links

Populated places in Jönköping Municipality